Georg Henrik Tikkanen (9 September 1924, Helsinki – 19 May 1984, Espoo) was a Finland-Swedish author, known primarily for anti-war literature.  Several of his works are either autobiographical or semi-autobiographical.  Though Finnish, he published primarily in his mother tongue, Swedish.  He was born and lived much of his life in Helsinki, and died of leukemia in Espoo.  He was married to the Finnish writer Märta Tikkanen.

Biography 
Tikkanen was married to Lia Tikkanen from 1949 to 1962 and to Märta Cavonius from 1963. Tikkanen had no formal artistic training. After graduating in 1943, he pursued liberal arts studies and received some guidance in graphic techniques from some active graphic artists. From 1947 to 1967, Tikkanen was a columnist and cartoonist for Hufvudstadsbladet and from 1967 for the Finnish-language daily Helsingin Sanomat and from 1977 for Dagens Nyheter. Tikkanen's cityscapes of Helsinki, in which he depicted the city's characteristics in simple lines, are particularly well-known. As a draftsman, he worked mainly in ink and produced a series of black-and-white drawings as a quick draftsman for various restaurants and companies in Finland. He participated in a large number of exhibitions in Finland, Denmark and Sweden. Tikkanen is represented at the Gothenburg Museum of Art and Svenska Klubben in Ekenäs, among others.

Tikkanen is also known for his writing. He wrote a series of autobiographical and expository books, including , in which he came to terms with his Finnish-Swedish bourgeois background. These books were one of the causes of the Tikkanen-Kihlman debate, which was partly about the negative image of the Finnish-Swedish upper class given by the two authors' self-confessions. As a book author, he published the book  in 1955, which he illustrated with types of people, street pictures, restaurant life and architecture from post-war Stockholm.

Bibliography

Reviews
 Herdman, John (1980), review of Snob's Island in Cencrastus No. 4, Winter 1981–82, p. 46,

References 

 
 

Finnish writers in Swedish
Finnish military personnel of World War II
Recipients of the Eino Leino Prize
Deaths from leukemia
Writers from Helsinki
1924 births
1984 deaths
Swedish-speaking Finns